Grand-Rullecourt is a commune in the Pas-de-Calais department in the Hauts-de-France region of France.

Geography

Population

Places of interest
 The chateau, built in 1746 by Antoine-Constant de Hamel, next to the previous castle, to plans by Jean-Joseph de Watelet, mayor of the city of Arras. After the French Revolution, the chateau was sold as a national asset, (Antoine's son having died on the scaffold). His grandson bought it back but couldn't afford to keep it. It later belonged to Captain Wallerand de Hauteclocque, who was killed during World War I. After the war, the property was sold in parts. The present owners, Vicomte Patrice de Saulieu O'Toole and his wife Chantal, are currently restoring the main building.
 The church of St.Leger, dating from the seventeenth century.
 A network of tunnels, particularly under the church.

See also
Communes of the Pas-de-Calais department

References

External links

 Photos of the tunnels

Grandrullecourt